Stanojević is a Serbian patronymic surname derived from the male given name Stanoje. It may refer to:

Aleksandar Stanojević, Serbian football manager and former player
Aca  Stanojević Serbian politician in the time of interwar Yugoslavia
Jovanka Stanojević, Serbian painter
Marko Stanojevic, Italian rugby player
Marko Stanojević, Serbian footballer
Veljko Stanojević (1892–1967), Serbian painter
Stanoje Stanojević (1874-1937), Serbian historian and academic
Duško Stanojević, Serbian sprint canoer
Obrad Stanojević, Serbian academic
Miloš Stanojević (rower), Serbian rower
Miloš Stanojević (footballer)

See also
Stanojevići
Stanojković
Stanojčić

Serbian surnames
Patronymic surnames